Veera Chudamani is a national honour for bravery awarded in Sri Lanka. It is awarded "for acts of bravery of the highest order". It is conventionally used as a title or prefix to the awardee's name. 

Veera Chudamani ranks lower than Deshabandu.

Awardees
Awardees include: 

1998
 Manorani Saravanamuttu - Founded the Centre for Family Service

2005
 Hettiarachchige Gamini Sirisoma Jayasekera

References

External links

Civil awards and decorations of Sri Lanka